{{Automatic taxobox
| name = Candidatus Phytoplasma pruni
| taxon = Candidatus Phytoplasma
| species_text = Ca. P. pruni| binomial_text = Candidatus Phytoplasma pruni
| authority = Davis et al. 2013
| synonyms = 
| synonyms_ref = 
}}Candidatus Phytoplasma pruni is a species of phytoplasma in the class Mollicutes, a class of bacteria distinguished by the absence of a cell wall. The specific epithet pruni means "living on Prunus", emphasizing the fact that the phytoplasma is a parasite of various Prunus species, otherwise known as stone fruits. The phytoplasma is commonly called the X-disease phytoplasma.

Like all phytoplasmas, Candidatus Phytoplasma pruni infects both plants and insects. Potential plant hosts include peach, cherry, plum, and others. Known insect hosts include various species of leafhoppers. Since the pathogen can not live outside of host cells, it must be transmitted to a new plant host by an infected leafhopper.

Taxonomy
The name Candidatus Phytoplasma pruni' was informally suggested by the International Research Program for Comparative Mycoplasmology in 2004, but the taxon was not formally described until 2013. It belongs to the X-disease group (16Sr group III), subgroup A (16SrIII-A), the most studied subgroup of 16SrIII. This subgroup of phytoplasma is associated with a number of diseases:

PX11CT1R is the reference strain for Candidatus Phytoplasma pruni'.

Related strains
Certain strains of phytoplasmas related to 'Candidatus Phytoplasma pruni' are associated with diseases of various plant species, including blueberry, clover, goldenrod, milkweed, spirea, pecan, poinsettia, potato, and walnut. These strains are classified in other subgroups of group III as follows:

A 'Candidatus Phytoplasma pruni'-related strain in subgroup 16SrIII-F has also been implicated as the cause of a greening disorder of Trillium grandiflorum and other Trillium species.

X-disease

X-disease was first discovered in California in 1931, where it was described as cherry buckskin. In 1933, the disease was found on peach in Connecticut, where it was called "X disease of peach" due to its unknown cause and mysterious nature. For many years, X-disease of peach was believed to be caused by a virus that was carried by insect vectors from nearby forests to peach orchards. In 1971, X-disease was found to be associated with mycoplasma-like organisms (now called phytoplasmas).

X-disease is an infectious disease of stone fruits (Prunus spp.). The disease is caused by Candidatus Phytoplasma pruni, a strain of phytoplasma belonging to 16Sr group III, the X-disease group of phytoplasmas.

Hosts
Historically, X-disease has been a major limiting factor in peach production in the United States. In addition to peach (Prunus persica), other species of the genus Prunus are susceptible to infection by the X-disease pathogen, including Prunus americana (wild American plum), Prunus armeniaca (apricot), Prunus avium (cherry), Prunus besseyi (Bessey cherry), Prunus cerasus (cherry), Prunus domestica (European plum), Prunus dulcis (almond), Prunus japonica (Chinese bush-cherry), Prunus munsoniana (wildgoose plum), Prunus persica var. nectarina (nectarine), Prunus salicina (Japanese plum), and Prunus virginiana (wild chokecherry).

Vectors
X-disease is transmitted by various species of leafhoppers in family Cicadellidae, including Colladonas clitellarius, C. montanus, C. geminatus, Euscelidius variegatus, Fieberiella florii, Graphocephala confluens, Gyponana lamina, Keonella confluens, Norvellina seminuda, Osbornellus borealis, Paraphlepsius irroratus, and Scaphytopius delongi.

Distribution
X-disease is present in North America (Canada, Costa Rica, United States) and South America (Argentina). It is localized in Canada (British Columbia, New Brunswick, Ontario) and widespread in the United States (California, Colorado, Connecticut, Massachusetts, Michigan, Missouri, Nebraska, New York, North Dakota, Oregon, Pennsylvania, Utah, Virginia, Washington). The disease may also be present in Asia (India, Japan), Europe (Poland), and additional U.S. states.

See also
 Cherry X-disease
 Milkweed yellows phytoplasma

References

External links
 

Mollicutes
Bacterial tree pathogens and diseases
Bacterial plant pathogens and diseases
Ornamental plant pathogens and diseases
Candidatus taxa